Meridian Township is one of fifteen townships in Clinton County, Illinois, USA.  As of the 2010 census, its population was 547 and it contained 255 housing units.

Geography

Unincorporated towns
 Ferrin
 Shattuc
(This list is based on USGS data and may include former settlements.)

Cemeteries
The township contains two cemeteries: Bethlehem Lutheran and Stacey.

Major highways
  US Route 50

Demographics

School districts
 Carlyle Community Unit School District 1
 Sandoval Community Unit School District 501

Political districts
 Illinois's 19th congressional district
 State House District 108
 State Senate District 54

References
 
 United States Census Bureau 2007 TIGER/Line Shapefiles
 United States National Atlas

External links
 City-Data.com
 Illinois State Archives

Townships in Clinton County, Illinois
Townships in Illinois